Ian Michael Smith (born May 5, 1987) is an American actor, known for his starring role in Simon Birch.

His short physical stature is a result of Morquio syndrome, a rare enzymatic disorder affecting the circulatory, muscular and skeletal systems.

Life and work
Smith was born in Elmhurst, Illinois. A Chicago-area hospital worker approached his parents about him auditioning for the leading role in The Mighty, a feature film about a character with Morquio Syndrome. Kieran Culkin was cast instead, but Smith was recommended for the title role of Simon Birch (1998), a film based loosely on John Irving's novel A Prayer for Owen Meany, which also called for a small child actor.

He graduated from York Community High School in Elmhurst in 2005. He has undergone several operations including a spinal fusion and two bilateral osteotomies. He graduated from the Massachusetts Institute of Technology in 2009, and Gallaudet University in 2012 and now works as a software engineer. He is a co-founder of a nonprofit organization, Project Alloy, that gives assistance to underrepresented people in tech fields. In 2019, he joined a class action lawsuit against the City of Oakland for excluding people with disabilities from the city’s rent control program.

References

External links

Ian Michael Smith at Hollywood.com

1987 births
Male actors from Illinois
American male child actors
American male film actors
Living people
People from Elmhurst, Illinois
20th-century American male actors
Massachusetts Institute of Technology alumni
Gallaudet University alumni